Daredevil Adventures featuring Deadly Coins and other stories is an adventure published by Fantasy Games Unlimited (FGU) in 1983 for the pulp magazine-inspired role-playing game Daredevils.

Contents
Daredevil Adventures featuring Deadly Coins and other stories contains three scenarios:
"The Powers of Dr. Remoux" by Stefan Jones
"Bring it Back Alive!" by Bob Charrette
"Deadly Coins" by J. Andrew Keith

Publication history
FGU published the role-playing game Daredevils in 1982. The first set of adventures, Daredevil Adventures 1: Deadly Coins, was published the following year, a 24-page softcover with illustrations by William H. Keith, Jr. Three more sets of adventures followed — Daredevil Adventures Vol. 2 No. 2: The Menace Beneath the Sea, Daredevil Adventures 3: Supernatural Thrillers Issue, and Daredevil Adventures Vol. 2 No. 4: Lost World Tales — before publication ceased due to poor sales.

Reception
Writing for Imagine, Paul Cockburn found that Daredevil Adventures 1: Deadly Coins successfully recreated the pulp magazine genre but at the expense of creativity, saying, "The plotlines are not very startling, but the key elements are simply found by the GM, and there is usually at least one blind alley for the adventurers to follow, but I find with all these games that, in an effort to catch the cliché that epitomises the era, the plots fall into expected grooves, and that most sophisticated players in the '80s will easily see through the deceptions of a more innocent age."

Reviews
Fantasy Gamer #1 (Aug./Sept., 1983)

References

Role-playing game adventures
Role-playing game supplements introduced in 1983